.krd is the Internet geographic top-level domain (gTLD) for Kurdistan Region of Iraq. 

On 5 December 2013, the Department of Information Technology of the Kurdistan Region received a registry agreement signed by ICANN for .krd after passing all the required processes needed to become the registry operator for the domain.

References

External links 
 www.gov.krd (Kurdistan Regional Government)
 president.gov.krd (Kurdistan Region Presidency)
 KRG Department of Information Technology
 How to register a Kurdistan .KRD domain 
  register .KRD domain

Computer-related introductions in 2014
Generic top-level domains
Kurdistan